The Railway Regulation (Gauge) Act 1846 (9 & 10 Vic. c.57) is an Act of the Parliament of the United Kingdom, that was designed to standardise railway tracks. It achieved royal assent on 18 August 1846, during the reign of Queen Victoria of the United Kingdom of Great Britain and Ireland. It mandated that the track gauge – which was the distance between the two running rails' inner faces – of 4 feet 8 inches to be the standard for Great Britain and 5 feet 3 inches to be the standard for Ireland.

The Act 
 
The Act stipulated that:

Furthermore, it also provided that, following the Act's passing, it would be illegal to alter a railway gauge that was in use for the conveyance, i.e. transport, of passengers.

Assessment 
The Act continued legislative approval of the broad-gauge railways constructed by the Great Western Railway engineer Isambard Kingdom Brunel and endorsed the construction of several new broad-gauge lines, but restricted them to the south-west of England and to Wales. The Act stated that these railways "shall be constructed on the Gauge of Seven Feet". The resulting isolation of these lines ultimately contributed to the demise of the Great Western Railway broad-gauge system.

Notes

References

See also
 British Gauge War
 Rail gauge in Ireland
 Standard gauge

External links
 Railways Archive entry for the act

1846 in British law
7 ft gauge railways
5 ft 3 in gauge railways
Standard gauge railways
United Kingdom Acts of Parliament 1846
1846 in rail transport
History of rail transport in the United Kingdom
1846 in England
1846 in Scotland
1846 in Ireland
Railway Acts